Ledisol is a census town in the Khatra CD block in the Khatra subdivision of the Bankura district in the state of West Bengal, India.

Geography

Location

Area overview
The map alongside shows the Khatra subdivision of Bankura district. Physiographically, this area is having uneven lands with hard rocks. In the Khatra CD block area there are some low hills. The Kangsabati project reservoir is prominently visible in the map. The subdued patches of shaded area in the map show forested areasIt is an almost fully rural area.

Note: The map alongside presents some of the notable locations in the subdivision. All places marked in the map are linked in the larger full screen map.

Demographics
According to the 2011 Census of India, Ledisol had a total population of 5,056, of which 2,582 (51%) were males and 2,474 (49%) were females. There were 447 persons in the age range of 0–6 years. The total number of literate persons in Ledisol was 4,235 (91.89% of the population over 6 years).

.*For language details see Khatra (community development block)#Language and religion

Infrastructure
According to the District Census Handbook 2011, Bankura, Ledisol covered an area of 1.405 km2. Among the civic amenities, it had 13.5 km of roads, the protected water supply involved tap water from treated sources, tubewell/ borewell. It had 670 domestic electric connections, 272 road lighting points. Among the medical facilities it had 1 dispensary/ health centre, 1 family welfare centre, 1 maternity and child welfare centre, 4 medicine shops. Among the educational facilities it had were 2 primary schools, 1 middle school, 1 secondary school, 1 senior secondary school, the nearest general degree college at Supur 4 km away. It had 2 non-formal education centres (Sarva Shiksha Abhiyan). Among the social cultural and recreational facilities, it had 1 cinema theatre, 1 auditorium/ community hall, 1 public library, 1 reading room. The three most important commodities it manufactured were rice, wheat, mustard oil. It had the branch of 1 cooperative bank.

References

Cities and towns in Bankura district